Bill Pigott (born October 13, 1946) is an American politician. He is a member of the Mississippi House of Representatives from the 99th District, being first elected in 2007. He is a member of the Republican party.

References

1946 births
Living people
Republican Party members of the Mississippi House of Representatives
21st-century American politicians
People from Tylertown, Mississippi